Jerry Schillinger is an American farmer and politician from Montana. He is a Republican member of the Montana House of Representatives for district 37.

Montana State Legislature

2020 State House of Representatives election

References

External links
 Jerry Schillinger at VoteSmart

Living people
21st-century American politicians
Republican Party members of the Montana House of Representatives
University of Montana alumni
People from McCone County, Montana
Year of birth missing (living people)